The 1895 Guilford Quakers football team represented Guilford College as an independent during the 1895 college football season. They had a 1–1 record.

Schedule

References

Guilford
Guilford Quakers football seasons
Guilford Quakers football